The acronym FOSA can refer to:

Friends of South Asia, a South Asian American activist group
Perfluorooctanesulfonamide, a synthetic chemical compound that is also abbreviated PFOSA
Fiber Optic Sensing Association, a non-profit industry association that promotes fiber-optic sensing technology.